George Crin Laurențiu Antonescu (born 21 September 1959) is a Romanian politician, who was President of the National Liberal Party (PNL) from 2009 to 2014. He also served as the country Acting President after the impeachment of Traian Băsescu and as the President of the Senate.

He is a member of the Senate. He was first elected to the Senate in the 2008 legislative election. From 1996 to 2008, he was a member of the Chamber of Deputies, acting as leader of the party delegates between 2007 and 2008. On 3 July 2012 he was elected President of the Senate after the dismissal of the former leader, Vasile Blaga, from office. He became Acting President of Romania on 10 July 2012 after the Parliament suspended Traian Băsescu for the second time on 6 July 2012.

On 4 March 2014, during the debate in parliament on the vote for a new government, Antonescu resigned as president of the Senate.

Early life and education
Antonescu was born in Tulcea, Tulcea County, Socialist Republic of Romania. After his parents' divorce, he was raised by his father, a distant relative of Ion Antonescu, who encouraged him to attend the Faculty of History and Philosophy at the National University of Bucharest (UB), in order to become a history teacher.

Professional career
Upon graduating in 1985, Crin Antonescu worked as a History teacher in the village of Solești, Vaslui County. He later returned to Tulcea, continuing his teaching activity in Niculițel until 1989. Antonescu worked as a curator for the Tulcea Museum of History and Archaeology from 1989 to 1990, when he resumed his teaching activity at the "Spiru Haret" High School in Tulcea, prior to being elected to the Chamber of Deputies.

Political career

Upon joining the National Liberal Party (PNL), Antonescu helped organize the Tulcea branch of the party. In 1995, he was elected PNL Vice President and, subsequently, leader of the liberal politicians active in the Chamber of Deputies, holding that position for two non-consecutive mandates. During his activity in the Chamber of Deputies, he was a member of the Committee for Education, Youth and Sports, the Foreign Affairs Committee and the Committee of Culture, Arts and Media.

Antonescu was the Romanian Minister of Youth and Sports from 1997 to 2000. He initiated a series of reforms, the most prominent being the legal perpetuity for Romanian athletes with significant Olympic results.

As of 20 March 2009, Antonescu was the President of the National Liberal Party (PNL), in addition to being the party's candidate for the 2009 presidential elections in Romania. In September 2009, Antonescu was situated third in Romanians' voting preferences for the 2009 Presidential elections.

After President Traian Băsescu's suspension on 3 July 2012, he assumed acting Presidency of Romania. After the end of the ad interim term as President of Romania, Antonescu continued to serve as Senate President until the dissolution of USL, after which he reigned from this dignity. After 2014, he slowly but steadily withdrew from politics, resigning from his last remaining political position in late February 2015.

Personal life
Antonescu's first wife Aurelia committed suicide in 2004 due to an incurable disease. The two have a daughter, Irina, born in 2001. In June 2009, Antonescu announced he will get married again to party colleague Adina Vălean. The couple got married on 25 September 2009.

Electoral history

Presidential elections

References

External links
  CrinAntonescu.ro, official candidacy website

|-

|-

|-

1959 births
Candidates for President of Romania
Chairpersons of the National Liberal Party (Romania)
Eastern Orthodox Christians from Romania
Living people
Members of the Chamber of Deputies (Romania)
Presidents of the Senate of Romania
National Liberal Party (Romania) politicians
People from Tulcea
Acting presidents of Romania
Members of the Romanian Orthodox Church